Ochman is a surname. Notable people with the surname include:

 Bruno Ochman (1929–1990), Canadian wrestler
 Joe Ochman, American actor
 Krystian Ochman (born 1999), also known mononymously as Ochman, Polish-American singer
 Wiesław Ochman (born 1937), Polish opera singer

See also 
 Mauricio Ochmann (born 1977), American-born actor